The year 1685 in music involved some significant events.

Events 
The father of Georg Philipp Telemann dies, leaving his widow to bring up the children.
Antonio Stradivari makes the ex Arma Senkrah violin.
John Blow is recorded among the private musicians of King James II of England.
The 17-year-old François Couperin becomes organist at St Gervais in Paris.
Giovanni Legrenzi becomes maestro di cappella at St Mark's Cathedral, Venice.

Published popular music

Classical music 
Giovanni Bononcini – 12 Sinfonie, Op. 3
Cristofaro Caresana – Dixit Dominus
Arcangelo Corelli – Op. 2, 12 trio sonatas
Le Sieur de Machy – Pieces de Violle
Nicolas Gigault – Livre de musique pour l'orgue
Nicolas Lebègue – Livre d'orgue No.3
Jean-Baptiste Lully 
Idylle sur la Paix, LWV 68
Ballet du temple de la paix, LWV 69
Johann Christoph Pezel – Fünfstimmige blasende Music
Henry Purcell – My heart is inditing (anthem), first performed at the coronation of King James II
Alessandro Scarlatti – Il martirio di S. Teodosia

Opera 
John Blow – Venus and Adonis
Marc-Antoine Charpentier
La Couronne de fleurs
Les arts florissants
Giuseppe Fabrini – La Genefieva
Jean-Baptiste Lully – Roland

Births 
March 5 (N.S.) – George Frideric Handel, composer (died 1759)
March 31 (NS) – Johann Sebastian Bach, composer (died 1750)
June 23 (NS?) – Antonio Maria Bernacchi, castrato singer (died 1756)
June 30 – John Gay, poet, author of The Beggar's Opera (died 1732)
September 20 – Giuseppe Matteo Alberti, composer and violinist (died 1751)
October 26 – Domenico Scarlatti, composer (died 1757)
December 12 – Lodovico Giustini, early composer for piano (died 1743)

Deaths 
March 31 – Juan Hidalgo de Polanco, harpist and composer (born 1614)
July 4 or (5) – George Jeffreys, composer (born c.1610)
September 22 – Ignazio Albertini, Italian musician and composer (born 1644)
date unknown
Jean-Baptiste Boësset, French composer (born 1614)
Yatsuhashi Kengyo, Japanese musician and composer (born 1614)

References 

 
17th century in music
Music by year